Ej, sudbino (Croatian: "Hey, fate") is the first studio album by Montenegrin singer Šako Polumenta and was released in 1993.

Track listing 
 Ne dozvoli
 Šta sam Bogu zgrešio 
 Ja sam srećan i nesrećan čovek
 Pesma o sinu
 Ej, sudbino
 Biljana
 Kažite mi
 Što se žena

1993 debut albums
Šako Polumenta albums